São Conrado (Portuguese: /sɐ̃w̃ kõˈʁadu/) is a neighborhood in the South Zone of the city of Rio de Janeiro, Brazil. It is nestled in between the neighborhoods of Barra da Tijuca to the southwest and Leblon to the northeast. The neighborhood takes its name from a small church, Igreja de São Conrado (Church of São Conrado), which was constructed early in the 20th century by Conrado Jacob Niemeyer (1831-1905). São Conrado, which ranks as one of the areas with the highest Human Development Index in Brazil, presents a stark contrast to Rocinha on its border, which is one of the largest and poorest favelas in Brazil.

São Conrado is famous for its hang gliding (popular with locals and tourists alike), Fashion Mall which houses over 150 stores carrying national and international designers, and golf course. The neighborhood, or bairro, is made up of sophisticated residential buildings, night clubs, and elegant restaurants. The famous Morro Dois Irmãos, or Two Brothers Mountain, featured in movies, television shows, and postcards from the city, separates the neighborhood from the rest of the South Zone. It is also noted for the mansions on the foot of the Pedra da Gávea, the largest seaside granite rock on Earth, which separates São Conrado from the West Zone. The House at Canoas (Casa das Canoas), the private home of Oscar Niemeyer (1907-2012), is located on Estrada das Canoas and is considered a masterpiece of Mid-century modern residential architecture.

São Conrado has been the most expensive and sought-after address in Rio, with celebrities such as Xuxa and even the mayor calling the area home. Real estate in the neighborhood is some of the priciest in South America.

Notable residents
Marcello Alencar, Governor of Rio de Janeiro (1995-1999), Mayor of Rio de Janeiro (1983-1986, 1989-1993)

References

External links 

 Hang-Gliding in Sao Conrado Off Pedra Bonita - HD Video Narrated in English
 Paragliding take-off on Pedra Bonita

Neighbourhoods in Rio de Janeiro (city)